James David Zellerbach (January 17, 1892 – August 3, 1963) was an American businessman and ambassador.

Biography
James David Zellerbach was born on January 17, 1892. He was raised in San Francisco, California. 

Zellerbach served as chairman of the board of the Crown Zellerbach Corporation. In 1957, Zellerbach was sworn in as United States Ambassador to Italy; he held the post until 1960. He was a member on the board of Wells Fargo Bank Council on Foreign Relations.

He died on August 3, 1963, of a brain tumor, during surgery at Mount Zion Hospital in San Francisco. Zellerbach is buried at Home of Peace Cemetery in Colma, California.

References

External links

1892 births
1963 deaths
Ambassadors of the United States to Italy
20th-century American diplomats
Burials at Home of Peace Cemetery (Colma, California)
Businesspeople from San Francisco